Derek Walker may refer to:

Derek Walker (architect), British architect and planner
Derek Walker (cricketer), New Zealand cricketer
Derek Walker (footballer), Scottish footballer
Derek Walker (gridiron football), American football player

See also
Derek Walker-Smith, Baron Broxbourne, British politician